The Beki Bosse Matie Classified Forest is found in Côte d'Ivoire, and covers 389 km.

References

External links
 APES MAPPER

Protected areas of Ivory Coast